The Futuna Plate is a very small tectonic plate located near the south Pacific island of Futuna. It is sandwiched between the Pacific Plate to the north and the Australian Plate to the south with the Niuafo'ou Plate to the east.

References
 Bird, P. (2003) An updated digital model of plate boundaries, Geochemistry, Geophysics, Geosystems, 4(3), 1027, . 

Tectonic plates
Geology of the Pacific Ocean